Roveredo in Piano (locally Lavoréit;) is a comune (municipality) in the Province of Pordenone in the Italian region Friuli-Venezia Giulia, located about  northwest of Trieste and about  northwest of Pordenone.

Roveredo in Piano borders the following municipalities: Aviano, Fontanafredda, Porcia, Pordenone, San Quirino.

References

External links
Official website 

Cities and towns in Friuli-Venezia Giulia